Philippe Bolo is a French politician of the Democratic Movement who has been serving as a member of the French National Assembly since 18 June 2017, representing the department of Maine-et-Loire.

Early life and career
Bolo is an agronomic engineer who moved to d'Arvillé in Maine-et-Loire in 2002.

Political career
Bolo became the deputy mayor of d'Arvillé with support of the Republicans. He competed with the UDI-MoDem list in the 2014 European Parliament election for France.

In parliament, Bolo serves as member of the Committee on Economic Affairs and the Parliamentary Office for the Evaluation of Scientific and Technological Choices (OPECST). In addition to his committee assignments, he is a member of the French-Japanese Parliamentary Friendship Group.

References

Living people
Deputies of the 15th National Assembly of the French Fifth Republic
Democratic Movement (France) politicians
Year of birth missing (living people)
Deputies of the 16th National Assembly of the French Fifth Republic